Bharat Petroleum is a monorail station on Line 1 of the Mumbai Monorail. It was opened to the public on 2 February 2014, as part of the first phase of Line 1. It serves connectivity to Mahul Gaon, HP Nagar, Bharat Nagar, Shivaji Nagar, Om Ganesh Nagar, Tata Colony and RCF Colony.

References

Mumbai Monorail stations
Railway stations in India opened in 2014